The Electronic System for Travel Authorization (ESTA) is an automated system that determines the eligibility of visitors to travel to the United States under the Visa Waiver Program (VWP). ESTA was mandated by the Implementing Recommendations of the 9/11 Commission Act of 2007. ESTA only authorizes travel to a U.S. airport, border or port of entry, but admissibility into the United States is determined by a U.S. Customs and Border Protection (CBP) officer upon arrival. The ESTA application collects biographic information and answers to VWP eligibility questions.

ESTA applications may be made at any time, but travelers are encouraged to apply at least 72 hours prior to travel. ESTA has an application fee of $4, and if approved, an additional fee of $17 is charged, for a total of $21. After approval, the authorization remains valid for two years, or until the passport expires if earlier, for multiple trips during that period. Each person traveling under the VWP, regardless of age, needs a separate ESTA.

ESTA is also needed for travel under the VWP to the U.S. territories of Puerto Rico, U.S. Virgin Islands, Guam and the Northern Mariana Islands, but some of these territories have separate waivers for certain nationalities that do not require ESTA. Travel to American Samoa requires a different electronic authorization or permit.

History 
Travelers were able to apply for ESTA in August 2008, and the authorization became mandatory for travel by air or sea from January 12, 2009. Since January 20, 2010, airlines may be fined if they do not require ESTA from passengers traveling under the VWP.

Initially ESTA was available for free from the U.S. Customs and Border Protection (CBP) website. On September 8, 2010, following the Travel Promotion Act, CBP began charging a fee of $4 to cover administrative costs, and if the application was approved, an additional fee of $10 to fund the Corporation for Travel Promotion (also known as Brand USA), for a total of $14 for each approved ESTA. On May 26, 2022, the second fee was increased to $17, for a total of $21 for each approved ESTA. The European Union criticized the fee when it was introduced, but later planned to also require an electronic travel authorization named ETIAS for a fee of €7.

ESTA became required also for entry by land from October 1, 2022.

Eligibility 
As of December 2022, nationals of 40 countries may travel to the United States under the Visa Waiver Program:

Visitors under the VWP may stay in the United States for 90 days, which also includes the time spent in Canada, Mexico, Bermuda, or the islands in the Caribbean if the arrival was through the United States.

Initially, dual nationals of VWP countries and Iraq, North Korea, Syria, Iran, Sudan, Libya, Somalia, Yemen were made ineligible for VWP via ESTA under The Visa Waiver Program Improvement and Terrorist Travel Prevention Act of 2015.

From January 21, 2016, those who have previously traveled to Iran, Iraq, Libya, North Korea, Somalia, Sudan, Syria or Yemen on or after March 1, 2011, or who are dual nationals of Iran, Iraq, North Korea, Sudan or Syria, are not eligible to travel under the VWP. However, those who traveled to such countries as diplomats, military, journalists, humanitarian workers or legitimate businessmen may have this ineligibility waived by the Secretary of Homeland Security. In any case, those ineligible for the VWP may still apply for a regular visa from a U.S. embassy or consulate.

Application 

In December 2018, CBP announced that instant ESTA approvals would no longer be available and reiterated that it "strongly encouraged" travelers to submit an online authorization request at least three days (72 hours) before traveling to the United States. However, CBP's website still says that "In most cases, a response is received within seconds of submitting an application."

Each travel authorization under ESTA can be valid for up to two years, for multiple trips during that period. However, travelers must obtain a new ESTA authorization if they are issued a new passport, or change their name, gender or country of nationality, or if any answer to their ESTA application eligibility questions changes.

Each entry under the Visa Waiver Program is only valid for a combined maximum stay of 90 days in the United States and its surrounding countries. The admission period cannot be extended under the program. If a longer stay is intended, a visa is required.

ESTA does not guarantee entry to the United States. CBP officers make the final determination of admissibility (entry) to the United States and may cancel or deny ESTA at any time during travel, for example for suspicions of giving false information in the application.

Mandatory information 
The applicant must provide the following information:
Full name and gender
Other names or aliases, if any
Date and city of birth (according to passport)
Country of nationality and passport
Other nationality including historic, if any
Passport number and expiration date
Address
Parents' names, if known
Employer's name and address, if any
Emergency contact, name, phone and address
U.S. point of contact information (a person, business or hotel one intends to visit)
Whether the applicant is a member of Global Entry
Applicants must also specify whether any of the following applies to them by way of yes/no answers. Applications will be denied if the applicant:
Has a physical or mental disorder posing a threat to others, or is a drug abuser, or has one of certain contagious diseases such as cholera, diphtheria, tuberculosis, plague, yellow fever, ebola or severe acute respiratory illnesses
Has ever been arrested or convicted for a crime that resulted in serious damage to property, or serious harm to another person or government authority
Has ever violated any law related to possessing, using, or distributing illegal drugs
Plans to engage in or has ever engaged in terrorist activities, espionage, sabotage, or genocide
Has committed fraud or misrepresented oneself or others to obtain, or assist others to obtain, a visa or entry into the United States
Intends to seek employment in the United States or was previously employed in the United States without prior permission from the U.S. government
Has been denied a U.S. visa, or been refused admission to the United States at a U.S. port of entry
Has previously stayed in the United States longer than the admission period
Has traveled to Iran, Iraq, Libya, North Korea, Somalia, Sudan, Syria or Yemen on or after March 1, 2011

Third-party websites 

Some websites offer to complete ESTA applications for a fee, often many times more than the required fee charged by the U.S. government. Access and application through the official U.S. government website are available to any travelers who qualify under the VWP program. Prevention of such "ESTA fee scams" was made more difficult when the mandatory U.S. government fee was imposed, as previous public education efforts focused on getting out the message that ESTA applications were free of charge and anybody requesting payment was an unauthorized third-party. Third-party websites try to make themselves look legitimate by using official-sounding web addresses and posting logos that resemble the U.S. government emblem. They may or may not contain a small disclaimer at the bottom of the page that says they are not associated with the U.S. government.

Even if one of the third-party websites is used, passengers themselves still have to complete the same form. Concerns have been raised that third-party sites could be used for identity theft, credit card fraud, or the distribution of malware.

See also 
 Visa policy of the United States
 European Travel Information and Authorisation System

References

External links 

BBC TV Documentary about unofficial ESTA websites
 Automated Passport control

United States Department of Homeland Security
United States immigration law
Expedited border crossing schemes